Ching-Li Chai (born 12 June 1956) is a Taiwanese mathematician.

Career
Chai completed his doctoral thesis, Compactification of the Siegel Moduli Schemes, in 1984, under the supervision of David Mumford at Harvard University. Chai was the Francis J. Carey Term Chair at the University of Pennsylvania from 2007 to 2012. He was elected to membership of Academia Sinica in 2010.

References

1956 births
Living people
20th-century Taiwanese mathematicians
21st-century Taiwanese mathematicians
Harvard Graduate School of Arts and Sciences alumni
Taiwanese expatriates in the United States
University of Pennsylvania faculty
Mathematicians at the University of Pennsylvania
Members of Academia Sinica